Maxime Jacques Marcel Verhagen (born 14 September 1956) is a retired Dutch politician of the Christian Democratic Appeal (CDA) party and historian.

Verhagen studied Contemporary history at the Leiden University obtaining a Master of Arts degree. Verhagen worked as a political consultant and campaign manager for the Christian Democratic Appeal from February 1986 until July 1989. After the European Parliamentary election of 1989 Verhagen was elected as a Member of the European Parliament on 25 July 1989. After the election of 1994 Verhagen was elected as a Member of the House of Representatives on 17 May 1994 serving as a frontbencher and spokesperson for Foreign and European Affairs. After the election of 2002 Party Leader and Parliamentary leader Jan Peter Balkenende became Prime Minister and Verhagen was selected as his successor as Parliamentary leader on 11 July 2002. After the election of 2003 Verhagen continued as Parliamentary leader. After the election of 2006 Verhagen was appointed as Minister of Foreign Affairs in the Cabinet Balkenende IV taking office on 22 February 2007. The Cabinet Balkenende IV fell exactly 3 years into its term and Verhagen took over as Minister for Development Cooperation taking office on 23 February 2010. Shortly after the election of 2010 Balkenende announced he was stepping down as Party Leader and Verhagen was anonymously selected as his successor on 9 June 2010.

After the election Verhagen returned to the House of Representatives as Parliamentary leader on 17 June 2010 and following a successful cabinet formation with Liberal Leader Mark Rutte formed the Cabinet Rutte I with Verhagen appointed as Deputy Prime Minister and Minister of Economic Affairs, Agriculture and Innovation taking office on 14 October 2010. The Cabinet Rutte I fell 18 months into its term and shortly thereafter Verhagen unexpectedly announced his retirement and that he wouldn't stand for the election of 2012.

Verhagen retired from active politics at 56 and became active in the private and public sectors as a corporate and non-profit director, and works as a trade association executive serving as Chairman of the Construction association since July 2013 and became a Member of the Social and Economic Council for the Industry and Employers confederation (VNO-NCW) in October 2015.

Early life and education
Maxime Jacques Marcel Verhagen was born on 14 September 1956 in Maastricht in the Netherlands Province of Limburg in a Roman Catholic family. He studied at Leiden University where he obtained a Master of Arts degree in History in 1986. For a brief period during his college years, Verhagen was associated with both left-wing  radicalism and the liberal People's Party for Freedom and Democracy (VVD). He joined the CDA in 1976.

Politics
Verhagen started working for the CDA and was elected to the city council of Oegstgeest, and then elected as a Member of the European Parliament for the European People's Party after the European Parliament election of 1989. After the general election of 1994, he was elected to the House of Representatives of the Netherlands. On 11 July 2002 he became CDA parliamentary leader in the House of Representatives. After became Minister of Foreign Affairs in the fourth Balkenende cabinet in 2007, he was succeeded in that position by Pieter van Geel. After the resignation of the Labour Party ministers, he became interim Minister for Development Cooperation.

When the Leader of the Christian Democratic Appeal and Parliamentary leader in the House of Representatives Jan Peter Balkenende became Prime Minister Verhagen succeed him as the Parliamentary leader in the House of Representatives on 11 July 2002. During the Cabinets Balkenende I, II en III Verhagen became the unofficial Deputy leader of the Christian Democratic Appeal. 

He became the Minister of Foreign Affairs in the Cabinet Balkenende IV serving from 22 February 2007 to 14 October 2010, while he also served as Minister for Development Cooperation following the resignation from Bert Koenders. As such, at the request of gay rights groups, Verhagen called upon the Nuncio to the Netherlands, Monsignor François Bacqué, to respond to accusations that the Roman Catholic Church opposed homosexual rights. He later expressed concern at the lifting of the excommunication of controversial bishop Richard Williamson, a member of the Society of Saint Pius X. 

The Christian Democratic Appeal did badly in the general election of 2010, and the then Christian Democratic Appeal Party leader and Prime Minister, Jan Peter Balkenende, resigned the same day. Verhagen replaced him as leader of the Christian Democratic Appeal parliamentary party.

After the 2010 Dutch cabinet formation Verhagen became the Minister of Economic Affairs, Agriculture and Innovation and Deputy Prime Minister in the first Rutte cabinet. Verhagen resigned in November 2012, together with the rest of the cabinet.

Other activities
 European Bank for Reconstruction and Development (EBRD), Ex-Officio Alternate Member of the Board of Governors (2007-2010)

Controversy
In 2021, Dutch newspaper de Volkskrant published about an integrity case study in which Maxime Verhagen was involved. Verhagen had been paid by the Province of Limburg to negotiate with industrial company VDL Groep as an 'ambassador' of the Province of Limburg. At the same time, Verhagen was on VDL Groep's payroll as an advisor. Verhagen was subsequently fired by the Province of Limburg.

Personal
Verhagen is married to Annemieke Beijlevelt since 1984 and has 2 sons and 1 daughter. They live in Voorburg.

Decorations

References

External links

Official
  Drs. M.J.M. (Maxime) Verhagen Parlement & Politiek

|-

|-

|-

|-

|-

|-

 

|-

|-

|-

1956 births
Living people
Christian Democratic Appeal MEPs
Christian Democratic Appeal politicians
Contemporary historians
Deputy Prime Ministers of the Netherlands
Dutch campaign managers
Dutch corporate directors
Dutch nonprofit directors
Dutch political consultants
Dutch Roman Catholics
Dutch trade association executives
Leaders of the Christian Democratic Appeal
Leiden University alumni
Academic staff of Leiden University
Members of the House of Representatives (Netherlands)
Members of the Social and Economic Council
MEPs for the Netherlands 1989–1994
Ministers for Development Cooperation of the Netherlands
Ministers of Agriculture of the Netherlands
Ministers of Economic Affairs of the Netherlands
Ministers of Foreign Affairs of the Netherlands
Municipal councillors in South Holland
Officers of the Order of Orange-Nassau
Politicians from Maastricht
People from Oegstgeest
People from Voorburg
Recipients of the Decoration of Merit
Sint-Maartenscollege (Maastricht) alumni
20th-century Dutch historians
20th-century Dutch politicians
21st-century Dutch historians
21st-century Dutch politicians